RAAF Williams  is a Royal Australian Air Force (RAAF) military air base set across two locations, at Point Cook and Laverton, located approximately  south-west of the Melbourne central business district in Victoria, Australia. Both establishments previously existed as separate RAAF Bases (RAAF Base Point Cook and RAAF Base Laverton) until 1989 when they were amalgamated to form RAAF Williams. The name was chosen in honour of Air Marshal Sir Richard Williams, the 'father' of the RAAF.

RAAF Williams, Point Cook is the birthplace of the Royal Australian Air Force and is the oldest continually operating military airfield in the world. Since 1994 RAAF Williams (Point Cook) has been the home of RMIT Flight Training.

RAAF Base Point Cook

The land area at Point Cook was purchased by the Australian Government in 1912 with the vision to form what would become the Australian Flying Corps. Due to the success of the AFC in the First World War, the AFC became a separate service, now known as the Royal Australian Air Force. Point Cook remained the RAAF's only base until 1925 when RAAF Base Richmond and RAAF Base Laverton were also built.

Point Cook is considered the birthplace and the spiritual home of the RAAF. It is also the airport at which the Royal Victorian Aero Club was established. It contains a memorial parade ground which was built in the 1920s, a site which was previously used by the AFC for drill training. Point Cook still has an operating airfield, but military operations are generally restricted to the museum based there. The airfield is used by a number of general aviation users, although it is still classified as a military aerodrome. It is the oldest continuously operating military aerodrome in the world. Radio communication frequencies include CTAF on 126.2 MHz. The airfield NDB is inactive.

RAAF Williams, Point Cook, is the former home of the RAAF College including Officer Training School (OTS) and the RAAF Academy from 1961 to 1985, and is currently used for the Air Force element of the Australian Defence Force Gap Year Program. All administrative functions are located at RAAF Williams, Laverton, and there is a single mess service (Officers Mess Annexe) which provides a meal service to all personnel, and a bar service to Gap Year students only.

The RAAF Museum is located at Point Cook and has a large collection of ex-RAAF aircraft and military memorabilia from the prewar years until recent decades. The museum is open every day except Monday.

RAAF Williams, Laverton
Laverton is the third oldest RAAF base, being built in 1925 at the same time as RAAF Base Richmond, which was opened slightly before Laverton. It also contains all the administrative functions of RAAF Williams. Other units at Laverton are the ADF School of Languages, Defence International Training Centre (DITC), Director General Technical Airworthiness, No. 21 (City of Melbourne) Squadron (RAAF Active Reserve) and a number of smaller sub-units. It also hosts an element of 8th/7th Battalion of the Royal Victoria Regiment, Australian Army Reserve, as well as elements of the Defence Materiel Organisation (DMO).

In 1946 Laverton played host to the first flight of the newly formed Trans Australia Airlines, its Douglas DC-3 VH-AES Hawdon forced to use the base as operations at Essendon had become adversely affected by recent heavy rains. The base hosted the shotgun portion of the shooting events for the 1956 Summer Olympics.

Laverton's runway was decommissioned September 1996. In early 2007 the Victorian Government gave approval for the land that was formerly the Laverton airfield and runway to be developed into the new suburb of Williams Landing. Three areas totalling  were set aside for conservation. Williams Landing is being developed into a transit-oriented development, major activity centre and employment node. As well as being a major activity centre and employment node, there will also be four residential neighbourhoods each with their own distinctive character. Construction of Williams Landing commenced in late 2007 and is due for completion by 2025.

In 2016 it was speculated that the Department of Defence would completely shut down Laverton and its land sold under plans by the RAAF to consolidate its facilities towards northern Australia.

Units
The following units are located at RAAF Williams:

Other activities
The 1948 Australian Grand Prix was held on a racetrack mapped out on the runways and support roads of the Point Cook airfield. The race was won by Frank Pratt driving a BMW 328. Also, since 1994 RAAF Williams (Point Cook) has been the home of RMIT Flight Training.

Werribee Satellite Aerodrome
Land was set aside by the Australian Government west of the Williams bases from 1940 to 1952 for a spare grass airfield and aircraft storage. Several hangars and accommodation buildings were built in 1942 by the United States Army Air Forces (USAAF) in the style of US hangars. The USAAF units assigned to Werribee left in 1945. The land was part of what is now the Western Treatment Plant.

Two hangars remain on the land. The northernmost hangar on Geelong Road near Farm Road now houses a former RAAF Consolidated B-24 Liberator under restoration by the B-24 Liberator Memorial Restoration Fund.

See also
 United States Army Air Forces in Australia (World War II)
 List of airports in Victoria
 List of Royal Australian Air Force installations

References

External links

RAAF Williams at airforce.gov.au

Venues of the 1956 Summer Olympics
Olympic shooting venues
Royal Australian Air Force bases
Airfields of the United States Army Air Forces in Australia
RMIT University
Sports venues in Victoria (Australia)
Motorsport venues in Victoria (Australia)
Airports in Victoria (Australia)
Australian Grand Prix
1912 establishments in Australia
Airports established in 1912
Defunct motorsport venues in Australia
Buildings and structures in the City of Wyndham